The 1928 All-Ireland Senior Football Championship was the 42nd staging of Ireland's premier Gaelic football knock-out competition. Kildare were the winners.

Results

Connacht Senior Football Championship

Leinster Senior Football Championship

Munster Senior Football Championship

Ulster Senior Football Championship

All-Ireland Senior Football Championship

Championship statistics

Miscellaneous

 Cork win the Munster title for the first time since 1916.
 Sligo win the Connacht title for the first time ever.
 Kildare are All Ireland champions for the second year in a row.

References

External links

, a British Pathé newsreel of the Kildare-Dublin Leinster final